The 2014 Tajik League is the 23rd season of Tajik League, the Tajikistan Football Federation's top division of association football. Ravshan Kulob are the defending champions, having won the previous season. The season started on 12 April 2014.

Teams

League table

Results

Top scorers

References

External links
Football federation of Tajikistan

Tajikistan Higher League seasons
1
Tajik
Tajik